The third series of Top Gear Australia began on 28 September 2010 with a 75-minute Ashes Special featuring the presenters of both the Australian and UK Top Gear's competing in a series of challenges. This special was used a promotional tool by the Nine Network, who, as of late 2009, had acquired the airing rights to both the UK and Australian shows from SBS One. The series proper began 3 weeks later on 19 October. The show airs on Tuesday nights at 7:30pm on Channel Nine.

A number of changes were made by Nine for the 3rd series. Of the original hosts from SBS, only Steve Pizzati made the move, with new hosts Shane Jacobson & Ewen Page (editor-in-chief of Top Gear Australia magazine) replacing Warren Brown & James Morrison. while former Australian cricketer Shane Warne was added as an occasional guest reviewer. The test track at Camden Airport was redesigned and the 'Star Car' was replaced. The Proton Satria Neo used in the first 2 series on SBS made way for a more 'Australian' Ford XF Falcon Ute complete with bull bar, UHF CB aerial and stickers. (Nine also changed the name of the celebrity car challenge from 'Star In A Bog-Standard Car' to 'Star In A Car').

Due to the change in design of the Top Gear test track, in Episode 2 it was announced that the lap time leader board had been re-calibrated. The Stig drove 5 cars from the previous two seasons around the new track and a difference of +23.9% was calculated.

The Complete Third Series was released in March 2011. The Two Disc Collection contained all 3 episodes and The Ashes Special.

Episodes
{| class="wikitable plainrowheaders"
|-
! scope="col" style="background:#FFE98D;" | Total
! scope="col" style="background:#FFE98D;" | No.
! scope="col" style="background:#FFE98D;" | Title
! scope="col" style="background:#FFE98D;" | Reviews
! scope="col" style="background:#FFE98D;" | Features/challenges
! scope="col" style="background:#FFE98D;" | Guest(s)
! scope="col" style="background:#FFE98D;" | Original air date
! scope="col" style="background:#FFE98D;" | Viewers(millions)
|-

|}

Ratings

1 Viewer numbers are based on OzTAM data for Sydney, Melbourne, Brisbane, Adelaide and Perth combined.

References

External links
Official site
 
Top Gear Australia magazine site
Top Gear Australia Test Track

 

Top Gear Australia
2010 Australian television seasons

fr:Top Gear Australia
ru:Top Gear: Australia